Audrey Le Morvan (born 5 October 1987) is a former French para table tennis player who competed in international level events. She participated in three Paralympic Games and was a double bronze medalist. She was born with a deformed left forearm. She has competed in team events with Claire Mairie and Thu Kamkasomphou.

References

External links 
 
 

1987 births
Living people
People from Lannion
Paralympic table tennis players of France
Table tennis players at the 2004 Summer Paralympics
Table tennis players at the 2008 Summer Paralympics
Table tennis players at the 2012 Summer Paralympics
Medalists at the 2004 Summer Paralympics
Medalists at the 2008 Summer Paralympics
French female table tennis players
Paralympic medalists in table tennis
Paralympic bronze medalists for France
Sportspeople from Côtes-d'Armor
20th-century French women
21st-century French women